Carrierea is a genus of flowering plants belonging to the family Salicaceae.

Its native range is Southern China, Indo-China.

Species:

Carrierea calycina 
Carrierea dunniana 
Carrierea vieillardii

References

Salicaceae
Salicaceae genera